Bahar is a village and municipality in the Beylagan Rayon of Azerbaijan. It has a population of 1,129.

References

Bahar village in Gahramanli administrative district of Beylagan region. The shaft is flat. This village, symbolically located next to the cotton state farm in 1965, is so named as a symbol [1].

The population living here consists of Azerbaijani Turks who migrated from Jabrayil's Horovlu village, Armenia's Gamarli region, Garagoyunlu village, Vedi region.

Populated places in Beylagan District